This article contains information about the literary events and publications of 1771.

Events
April 9 – Pedro Correia Garção is arrested and committed to prison by Sebastião de Melo, Marquis of Pombal.
unknown dates
Henry Mackenzie's The Man of Feeling inaugurates the fashion for sentimentalism in novels.
Sophie von La Roche's Geschichte des Fräuleins von Sternheim: Von einer Freundin derselben aus Original-Papieren und andern zuverläßigen Quellen gezogen ("History of Lady von Sternheim"), completed at Bönnigheim and published this year in Leipzig edited by the author's cousin Christoph Wieland in 2 volumes, is, within the tradition of German literature, the first significant novel by a woman, the first epistolary novel and the first "sentimental" novel.
Matthias Claudius begins editing and publishing the newspaper Der Wandsbecker Bothe.
Slovene literature: The Nouvi Zákon, a translation of the New Testament into the Prekmurje Slovene language by István Küzmics, the Hungarian Slovene writer and evangelical pastor, is published (in Halle).
Archbishop Richard Robinson founds the Armagh Public Library in the north of Ireland.

New books

Fiction
Sophia Briscoe – Miss Melmoth; or the New Clarissa
Claude Joseph Dorat – Les Sacrifices de l'amour
Elizabeth Griffith – The History of Lady Barton
John Langhorne – Letters to Eleonara
Henry Mackenzie – The Man of Feeling
Louis-Sébastien Mercier – L'An 2440, rêve s'il en fut jamais
Tobias Smollett – The Expedition of Humphry Clinker
Sophie von La Roche – Geschichte des Fräuleins von Sternheim

Children
Christopher Smart – Hymns for the Amusement of Children

Drama
Isaac Bickerstaffe – He Wou'd If He Cou'd
José Cadalso – Sancho García
Richard Cumberland – The West Indian
Denis Diderot – Le Fils Naturel
Carlo Goldoni – Le Bourru Bienfaisant
Hugh Kelly – Clementina
George Alexander Stevens – The Fair Orphan
Alexander Sumarokov – Dmitri the Usurper

Poetry

James Beattie – The Minstrel
James Cawthorn – Poems
John Langhorne – The Fables of Flora
Thomas Percy – The Hermit of Warkworth
Henry James Pye – The Triumph of Fashion
Christoph Martin Wieland – Der neue Amadis

Non-fiction
John Brown – Description of the Lake of Keswick
Charles Burney – The Present State of Music in France and Italy
John Dalrymple – Memoirs of Great Britain and Ireland
John William Fletcher – Five Checks to Antinomianism
Oliver Goldsmith – The History of England
Samuel Johnson – Thoughts on the Late Transactions Respecting Falkland's Islands
Martinez de Pasqually – Traité sur la réintégration des êtres dans leur première propriété, vertu et puissance spirituelle divine (approximate year)
Thomas Pennant – A Tour in Scotland
Richard Price – Observations on Reversionary Payments
William Smellie – Encyclopædia Britannica (in 100 volumes)
Emanuel Swedenborg – True Christian Religion
John Wesley – Works
Arthur Young – The Farmer's Tour Through the East of England
Real Academia Española – Gramática

Births
January 17 – Charles Brockden Brown, American novelist (died 1810)
February 5 – John Lingard, English historian and Catholic priest (died 1851)
March 23 – Lumley Skeffington, English playwright and fop (died 1850)
June 13 – Sydney Smith, English wit and cleric (died 1845)
August 15 – Sir Walter Scott, Scottish novelist and poet (died 1832)
November 4 – James Montgomery, Scottish-born poet and hymnist (died 1854)
December 25 – Dorothy Wordsworth, English diarist and poet (died 1855)
December 26 – Heinrich Joseph von Collin, Austrian dramatist (died 1811)

Deaths
January 11 – Jean-Baptiste de Boyer, Marquis d'Argens, French philosopher (born 1704)
February 2 – John Lockman, English historian, poet and translator (born 1698)
March 9 – Henry Pemberton, English man of letters and physician (born 1694)
May 21 – Christopher Smart, English poet (born 1722)
July 30 – Thomas Gray, English poet (born 1716)
September 17 – Tobias Smollett, Scottish novelist, journalist and translator (born 1721)
October 14 – John Gill, English theologian (born 1697)
December 26 – Claude Adrien Helvétius, French philosopher (born 1715)
probable – Luis Galiana y Cervera, Spanish theologian, philologist and writer (born 1740)

References

 
Years of the 18th century in literature